The following is a list of radio stations in North Macedonia.

National coverage

Regional  and local coverage

External links
 CHEcast 

 
North Macedonia
Radio stations